G.T. Marsh and Sons, also known as Marsh's Oriental Art Store, is a historic building in Monterey, California that is listed on the National Register of Historic Places.  It was listed on the National Register in 2007; the listing included one contributing building and one other contributing structure.

It was built in 1928 by Japanese craftsmen and includes Sichuan Chinese architecture.  According to its NRHP nomination, it is a "large, mysterious, architecturally outstanding, building" that is significant for representing "a highly artistic and specialized style that is unique to Monterey and possibly to the nation, and [which] has become one of the symbols of the City's important and colorful past."

References

External links

Commercial buildings completed in 1928
Buildings and structures in Monterey, California
Commercial buildings on the National Register of Historic Places in California
1928 establishments in California
National Register of Historic Places in Monterey County, California
Japanese-American culture in California